Peter Dahl (born 12 November 1984) is a New Zealand born American professional rugby union player. He plays as a flanker for Glendale Raptors in Major League Rugby having previously played for the USA Eagles internationally.

References

1984 births
New Zealand rugby union players
Living people
United States international rugby union players
People educated at Mount Aspiring College
Rugby union players from Christchurch
Rugby union flankers